The Systematics Association (SystAss for short) is a charitable organisation based in the UK founded in 1937 for the promotion of the study of systematics and taxonomy. It publishes research, organises conferences, and provides competitive research funds for systematics research.

History
The society arose from informal meetings held between Royal Botanic Gardens, Kew & John Innes Horticultural Institute (Merton) staff, leading to the formation of a joint zoological and botanical "Committee on Systematics in Relation to General Biology" on May 3, 1937.
The council then changed the name of the organisation to its present form. The original founding council included: Julian Huxley (Chairman), Hampton Wildman Parker (Zoological Secretary), and J. S. L. Gilmour (Botanical Secretary).

Functions
It publishes book volumes on a variety of related topics in the Systematics Association Special Volume Series  and a newsletter for members called The Systematist. An annual meeting especially for young researchers is usually held in the UK under its auspices as The Young Systematists' Forum.

Structure
Membership of the society is open to all by subscription. The Association's affairs are managed by a Council consisting of officers and members elected at annual general meetings. The officers are a President, a Secretary, a Meetings Secretary, a Grants & Awards Secretary, a Membership Secretary, a Treasurer, the Editor in Chief, a Newsletter Editor, and a Webmaster.

See also
 American Society of Plant Taxonomists
 Gesellschaft für Biologische Systematik
 International Association for Plant Taxonomy
 The Linnean Society of London
 Society of Systematic Biologists
 Swiss Systematics Society 
 Willi Hennig Society
 Systematic and evolutionary biogeography association

Further reading

References

British biology societies
Charities based in the United Kingdom
1937 establishments in the United Kingdom
Learned societies of the United Kingdom